Alsid Aural Desireau (March 30, 1898 – March 23, 1982) was a Canadian professional ice hockey player. He played with the Vancouver Millionaires of the Pacific Coast Hockey Association. He died in 1982 of bladder cancer.

References

External links

1898 births
1982 deaths
Ice hockey people from British Columbia
People from Nelson, British Columbia
Vancouver Millionaires players
Deaths from bladder cancer
Canadian ice hockey defencemen
Deaths from cancer in British Columbia